Maura Reilly is Director of the Zimmerli Art Museum at Rutgers University. She has dedicated her career as an author and curator to underrepresented artists, especially women.

Biography 
Reilly has an M.A. and a Ph.D. from the New York University Institute of Fine Arts in New York where worked under the supervision of Linda Nochlin. Reilly has held positions at Arizona State University, the American Federation of Arts, and as a professor and chair of art theory at the Queensland College of Art at the Griffith University in Brisbane, Australia. Reilly served as Executive Director and Chief Curator of the National Academy of Design. Reilly was the founding curator of the Elizabeth A. Sackler Center for Feminist Art at the Brooklyn Museum.

Academic work 
In 2015, Reilly organized an all-women issue of ARTnews, in which she offered up statistics demonstrating the continued sexism in the art world, which has been referenced repeatedly, including by Vulture magazine. Her work on curatorial activism, as expanded upon in her book Curatorial Activism: Towards an Ethics of Curating, is cited by others as a means to teach the need for increased visibility of marginalized artists. Curatorial Activism: Towards an Ethics of Curating was listed as one of the Top 10 Best Art Books of 2018 from the New York Times.

In 2019 she wrote about the lack of representation of women artists in the reinstallation of the permanent collection at the Museum of Modern Art. Exhibits curated by Reilly have been reviewed by arts media across the globe, including, most recently, her exhibition Wandamba yalungka/Winds change direction, which was reviewed in 2021 by The Brooklyn Rail. Reilly and Linda Nochlin co-curated Global Feminisms: New Directions in Contemporary Art, which was the first show at the Brooklyn Museum's Elizabeth A. Sackler Center for Feminist Art; the show was reviewed by the popular press including The New Yorker magazine and the New York Times.

Selected publications 

Reviewed by The Women's Review of Books and Signs

Reviewed by Women's Art Journal

 Reviewed by the New York Times, Women's Art Journal and the London Review of Books

Best art books of 2018 by the New York Times

Awards 
In 2005, Reilly won the Future Leadership Award from ArtTable, and in 2006 she received the President Award from the Women's Caucus of Art.

References 

New York University Institute of Fine Arts alumni
Arizona State University faculty
American women curators
American curators
American women writers
Living people
Year of birth missing (living people)